Mohamed Helmy is a retired Egyptian footballer and the current manager of Tala'ea El Gaish SC.

Career
Helmy was a former striker, and most recently coach of El Zamalek, a post from which he resigned in 2016 following successive Champions League defeats to South Africa's Mamelodi Sundowns. He also played for the Egyptian national football team, and was instrumental in helping Zamalek win the Egyptian Cup on May 25, 2008.

Honours

Player 
Zamalek
Egyptian Premier League: 2
 1984, 1988
Egypt Cup: 2
 1979, 1988
African Cup of Champions Clubs: 2
 1984, 1986
Afro-Asian Club Championship: 1
 1987

Manager 
Zamalek
Egyptian Super Cup: 1 
 2016

Assistant ..
( Egyptian Cup 2008 )

External links
Zamalek - The Official Website
Zamalek Sporting Club - Zamalek News in English
Zamalek Toolbar
Mohamed Helmy at Footballdatabase

Egyptian footballers
Zamalek SC players
Egyptian football managers
ENPPI SC managers
Zamalek SC managers
Living people
Egyptian Premier League players
1962 births
Association football forwards